Alexander James Skinner (2 November 1910 – 3 October 1968) was a member of the Queensland Legislative Assembly.

Biography
Skinner was born at Boonah, Queensland, the son of William Skinner and his wife Fanny Elizabeth (née Thomas). He attended school at Boonah and Ipswich, and became a fitter and turner at the Ipswich Railway Workshops. He was later costs clerk at the Main Roads Department.

On 5 January 1935 Skinner married Camilla Catherine Marjorie Archer (died 2003) and together had three daughters. He died at Ipswich in October 1968 and was buried in the Ipswich General Cemetery.

Public life
Skinner, the Labor Party candidate, won the seat of Somerset at the 1953 Queensland state election. He held the seat until 1957. For the last few months he represented the Queensland Labor Party after premier Vince Gair and most of his cabinet split from the Labor Party.

References

Members of the Queensland Legislative Assembly
1910 births
1968 deaths
Australian Labor Party members of the Parliament of Queensland
Queensland Labor Party members of the Parliament of Queensland
20th-century Australian politicians